Kevin Krawietz and Andreas Mies were the defending champions but lost in the quarterfinals to David Pérez Sanz and Mark Vervoort.

Pérez Sanz and Vervoort won the title after defeating Grzegorz Panfil and Volodymyr Uzhylovskyi 3–6, 6–4, [10–7] in the final.

Seeds

Draw

References
 Main Draw

Meerbusch Challenger - Doubles
2018 Doubles